The 2020–21 Women's Senior One Day Trophy was the 15th edition of the women's List A cricket competition in India. It took place from 11 March to 4 April 2021, with teams competing in round-robin divisions before a knockout stage. Railways won the tournament, their 12th title, beating Jharkhand in the final.

Competition format
The 37 teams competing in the tournament were divided into the Elite Group and the Plate Group, with the teams in the Elite Group further divided into Groups A, B, C, D and E. Each group took place in one host city, under COVID-19 protocols. The winner of each Elite Group progress to the quarter-finals, along with the best two second-placed teams. The final quarter-final spot is filled by the winner of a play-off between the third-best second-place side and the winner of the Plate Group. The top two teams in the Plate Group were promoted to the Elite Group for the following season, with the worst two performing sides across the Elite Groups being relegated.

The groups worked on a points system with positions within the groups being based on the total points. Points were awarded as follows:

Win: 4 points. 
Tie: 2 points. 
Loss: 0 points. 
No Result/Abandoned: 2 points. 

If points in the final table are equal, teams are separated by most wins, then head-to-head record, then Net Run Rate.

League stage

Points tables

Elite Group A

Elite Group B

Elite Group C

Elite Group D

Elite Group E

Plate Group

Source: BCCI

Fixtures

Elite Group A

Elite Group B

Elite Group C

Elite Group D

Elite Group E

Plate Group

Knockout stages

Play-off

Quarter-finals

Semi-finals

Final

Statistics

Most runs

Source: ESPN Cricinfo

Most wickets

Source: ESPN Cricinfo

References

 

Women's Senior One Day Trophy
Women's Senior One Day Trophy
Women's Senior One Day Trophy